Darren Paul Flutie  (born November 18, 1966) is a former Canadian football wide receiver for the BC Lions, Edmonton Eskimos, and the Hamilton Tiger-Cats. He is the Canadian Football League's fifth all-time leader in catches, behind Nik Lewis, Geroy Simon, Ben Cahoon, and Terry Vaughn. He is also fourth all-time in career receiving yardage behind Geroy Simon, Milt Stegall, and Allen Pitts. He held the BC Lions club record for receiving yardage in a season, 1731 yards, from 1994 to 2004 when Geroy Simon achieved 1750 yards. His Canadian career lasted from 1991 until 2002. He is the younger brother of quarterback Doug Flutie and also attended Boston College, though he did not graduate. He was as an analyst on the CFL on CBC from 2002 to 2006. In November 2006, Darren Flutie joined his brother, Doug Flutie, on the list of the CFL's Top 50 players of the league's modern era by Canadian sports network TSN. In 2007, he was inducted into the Canadian Football Hall of Fame. Since leaving CBC, Flutie has served as a high school football coach. He was volunteer coach with the Natick High School football team from 2007 until his son Troy graduated in 2014. He was also NHS' boys basketball head coach during the 2008–09 season. He then served as offensive coordinator at Newton South High School and since 2018 has held the same position at the Rivers School. He also works for a medical device company.

College statistics
1984: 9 catches for 214 yards and one touchdown.  This would be the only college season he played with brother Doug Flutie at quarterback.
1985: 42 catches for 469 yards and one touchdown.
1986: 35 catches for 531 yards and 5 touchdowns.
1987: 48 catches for 786 yards and 7 touchdowns.

Career regular season statistics

CFL records 
 Playoff receptions : 185
 Regular season receptions : 972 (since passed by others, including leader Nik Lewis in 2017)
 Most seasons 1,000 yards receiving : 9 (tied with Allen Pitts) (passed by Milt Stegall in 2008)

All-Star Seasons 
 1996
 1997
 1999

Grey Cup wins 
 1994
 1999

References

External links 
 The Flutie Brothers Band
 Darren Flutie - CFL on CBC

1966 births
Living people
American football wide receivers
American people of Lebanese descent
American players of Canadian football
BC Lions players
Boston College Eagles football players
Canadian Football Hall of Fame inductees
Canadian Football League announcers
Canadian football wide receivers
Edmonton Elks players
Hamilton Tiger-Cats players
People from Manchester, Maryland
Players of American football from Maryland
San Diego Chargers players
Sportspeople of Lebanese descent